Ingfrid Breie Nyhus (born 26 September 1978) is a Norwegian pianist, the daughter of fiddler Sven Nyhus and the younger sister of fiddler Åshild Breie Nyhus.

Career 
Ingfrid Breie Nyhus plays and creates folk, contemporary and classical music on the piano. She has studied piano at Norwegian Academy of Music, Sibelius Academy in Helsinki and Hochschule für Musik und Theater Hannover. In 1999 she won the Ungdommens Pianomesterskap (The Norwegian Youth piano championship] and also received the award for her interpretation of Geirr Tveitt. In 2005 she was the first recipient of Den norske solistpris (The Norwegian Soloist Award) when it was awarded for the first time during the Festspillene i Bergen. She has performed at concert series and festivals in Norway and Europe within folk, classical, jazz and contemporary genres.

Together with her father and sister she released the album Tre Nyhus (2005). In 2007 she released the album Edvard Grieg: Slåtter Opus 72, together with her sister, performed with piano and Hardanger fiddle. The album was nominated for 2007 Spellemannprisen in the category Classical music. In 2015, she released the album "Slåttepiano", and in 2021 "Slåttepiano II".

Honors 
2005: Den norske solistpris (The Norwegian Soloist Award)

Discography

Solo albums 
2015: Abstraction in Folk Art (LabLabel)
2015: Stille-stykkje (LabLabel)
2015: Slåttepiano (LabLabel)
2021: Slåttepiano II (LabLabel)

Collaborations 
With Sven Nyhus and Åshild Breie Nyhus
2005: Tre Nyhus (Heilo)

With Åshild Breie Nyhus
2007: Edvard Grieg: Slåtter Opus 72 (Simax)
2016: Hardanger Fiddle in Art Music (Simax) 

With Eir Inderhaug composed by Bjørn Kruse
2016: Portrait With Hidden Face (LabLabel)

Contributions 
2018: Donaueschinger Musiktage 2018 composed by Agata Zubel 
2017: Life Music composed by Helge Iberg 
2008: But a Machine composed by Knut Olaf Sunde

References

External links 

Åshild & Ingfrid Breie Nyhus - Myllargutens bruremarsj (live, 2006) on YouTube

Norwegian classical pianists
Heilo Music artists
Simax Classics artists
Norwegian Academy of Music alumni
Musicians from Oslo
Women classical pianists
1978 births
Living people
21st-century classical pianists